"Special Kind of Love" is a song by British singer-songwriter Dina Carroll, released in September 1992 as the second single from her debut album, So Close (1993). The song was written and produced by American record producers, songwriters, and remixers Clivillés and Cole. Carroll was approached by them and invited to New York to become the first British artist to work with the producers. The song reached number 16 in the UK Singles Chart, number 26 in the Netherlands and number 60 in Germany. A music video was also produced to promote the single.

Critical reception
The song received positive reviews from music critics. Larry Flick from Billboard described it as a "fun and infectious pop/dance ditty", remarking that the cut "bears a slight resemblance" to Mariah Carey's hit "Emotions", "without sounding like a carbon-copy." He also felt that Carroll "struts with the vocal prowess of a diva, while producers David Cole and Robert Clivilles dress her in sunny synths and spine-crawling beats." Dave Sholin from the Gavin Report wrote, "'So Close' gave American audiences a mere glimpse into the music and talent of Dina Carroll. This track should take her over the top." A reviewer from Lennox Herald viewed it as "classy". 

Andy Beevers from Music Week complimented it as a "superb upbeat soulful house track". In an retrospective review, Pop Rescue said that the singer's vocals "really shine here on this catchy track", where "she’s supported by some great warm strings and backing vocalists." Phil Shanklin of ReviewsRevues felt that C&C's "brand of uplifting gospelesque house is an excellent match for Dina’s vocals and a great workout for the backing singers." James Hamilton from the RM Dance Update compared it to American singer CeCe Peniston. Rupert Howe from Select described the track as "reasonably sprightly". Tim Southwell from Smash Hits declared it as "superb".

Track listing
 12-inch single, UK (1992)
"Special Kind of Love" (Monster club mix)
"Special Kind of Love" (Funky Fingers dub)
"Special Kind of Love" (D'apella)
"Special Kind of Love" (C&C radio 7-inch)
"Special Kind of Love" (C&C Special Love club)	
"Special Kind of Love" (C&C Special Love dub)

 CD single, UK and Europe (1992)
"Special Kind of Love" (radio mix) – 3:29
"Special Kind of Love" (Monster club mix) – 6:46
"Special Kind of Love" (C & C Special Love club) – 6:50
"If I Knew You Then" – 4:18

Charts

References

Dina Carroll songs
1992 singles
1992 songs
A&M Records singles
British house music songs
First Avenue Records singles
Song recordings produced by Robert Clivillés
Songs written by David Cole (record producer)
Songs written by Robert Clivillés